This is a list of speakers of the House of Representatives of the Netherlands.

List of speakers from 1815 to 1881

List of speakers of the House of Representatives since 1881

See also
 List of presidents of the Senate of the Netherlands

References

External links
  

Lists of political office-holders in the Netherlands
Netherlands, House of Representatives